Kiyombe can refer to:

 Kiyombe language (ISO 639-3: yom), a dialect of the Kongo language of western Central Africa spoken by the Yombe people
 Kiyombe, a sector (imirenge) of Nyagatare District, Rwanda

See also
 Yombe (disambiguation)